Hoya is a town in the District of Nienburg, in Lower Saxony, Germany. It is situated on the left and right bank of the Weser, approx. 20 km north of Nienburg, and 15 km southwest of Verden.

Hoya is also the seat of the Samtgemeinde ("collective municipality") Grafschaft Hoya. Hoya was the center of the medieval and early modern County of Hoya.

References

Towns in Lower Saxony
Nienburg (district)